The 1849 New Hampshire gubernatorial election was held on March 13, 1849.

Incumbent Democratic Governor Jared W. Williams did not stand for re-election.

Democratic nominee Samuel Dinsmoor Jr. defeated Whig nominee Levi Chamberlain and Free Soil nominee Nathaniel S. Berry with 53.73% of the vote.

General election

Candidates
Nathaniel S. Berry, Free Soil, judge of the Grafton County Court of Common Pleas, Free Soil nominee for Governor in 1846, 1847 and 1848
Levi Chamberlain, Whig, lawyer, former State Senator
Samuel Dinsmoor Jr., Democratic, former clerk of the New Hampshire Senate, president of the Ashuelot Bank

Results

Notes

References

1849
New Hampshire
Gubernatorial